The 1903–04 Bucknell Bison men's basketball team represented Bucknell University during the 1903–04 college men's basketball season. The Bisons team captain of the 1903–04 season was Pat Cheeseman.

Schedule

|-

References

Bucknell Bison men's basketball seasons
Bucknell
Bucknell
Bucknell